Albert Tatum Dent (born March 25, 1863) was a lawyer and politician in Mississippi. He lived in Macon, served in the state senate (1902-1908 and 1924-1928), and served as an alderman and as mayor of Macon (1884-1888). He was a Democrat.

References

External links
Findagrave entry (with photograph)

Democratic Party Mississippi state senators
1863 births
Year of death missing
People from Macon, Mississippi